Ting Mao-shih (born 10 October 1925) is a Taiwanese diplomat and politician.

Ting attended the University of Paris and began working for the Central News Agency in 1956. He left two years later for the Ministry of Foreign Affairs and began his diplomatic career. He was named a special adviser to the president after Chen Shui-bian was elected to the office in 2000, but chose to retire via resignation in August of that year. Ting served on a committee set up to investigate the 3-19 shooting incident of 2004, and was an adviser to Chen's successor Ma Ying-jeou starting in 2011.

References

1925 births
Living people
Republic of China politicians from Yunnan
Taiwanese Ministers of Foreign Affairs
University of Paris alumni
Taiwanese journalists
Senior Advisors to President Chen Shui-bian
Senior Advisors to President Ma Ying-jeou
Taiwanese people from Yunnan
Representatives of Taiwan to the United States
Taiwanese expatriates in France